The 2004 Welwyn Hatfield District Council election took place on 10 June 2004 to elect members of Welwyn Hatfield District Council in Hertfordshire, England. One third of the council was up for election and the Conservative Party stayed in overall control of the council.

After the election, the composition of the council was:
Conservative 31
Labour 15
Liberal Democrat 2

Election result
The results saw the Conservative increase their majority on the council after both they and the Liberal Democrats gained seats from Labour. The Conservatives made 4 gains from Labour in Hatfield North, Hatfield West, Howlands and Sherrards wards, with one Conservative councillor describing the results as "so good absolutely marvellous". Labour put their defeats down to mid-term unpopularity of the national Labour government.

However the Conservatives did lose one seat to the Liberal Democrats in Handside, and this, along with a Liberal Democrat gain from Labour in Hatfield Central, meant that the Liberal Democrats won their first seats on the council for 14 years. The Liberal Democrats said they had been successful after campaigning on local issues such as maintaining Welwyn Garden City and on Stanborough Park.

Meanwhile, the one candidate from the United Kingdom Independence Party came second in Northaw ward ahead of both Labour and the Liberal Democrats. Overall turnout in the election was 40.61%, a significant rise on the 2003 election.

Ward results

References

2004
2004 English local elections
2000s in Hertfordshire